In kickboxing and mixed martial arts (MMA), "freak show fight" is an idiom for a bout featuring a deep disparity in skill, experience or weight between the fighters. This kind of matchup was common in the early period of mixed martial arts history, but it has become increasingly rare due to the regulation of athletic commissions and the implementation of official weight classes. However, freak show fights remain particularly associated in popular culture to Japanese promotions, where they are still occasionally hosted. Those bouts are usually a source of controversy among pundits, as they are perceived to elevate spectacle over true competition, but they retain a measure of acceptance among wide audiences due to their entertainment value.

History
Early MMA promotions usually held little to no control over ability and weight, which resulted in heavily unbalanced openweight matchups. The first events of Ultimate Fighting Championship are acknowledged to have featured recurrent freak show fights, with the most famous being possibly the fight between 200lbs kenpo fighter Keith Hackney and 600lbs sumo wrestler Emmanuel Yarbrough. The promotion itself would not completely close itself against them until the end of the 1990s.

Around the same time, in turn, Japanese company Pride Fighting Championships embraced the concept, initiating the custom of creating matchups based on the idea of "technique vs. size" or "David vs. Goliath." Former Pancrase fighter Ikuhisa Minowa became a usual participant against superheavyweight fighters of diverse backgrounds, as did 400lbs professional wrestler Giant Silva from the opposite side. This trend was adopted by Japanese kickboxing promotion K-1, pushing the fighting careers of highly publicized superheavyweights like Bob Sapp, Akebono and Choi Hong-Man, who also competed at Pride. Freak show fighters usually drew large TV ratings in Japan, with a special match pitting Sapp against Akebono breaking historical records.

In 2010, due to a series of challenges, boxer James Toney fought former UFC Heavyweight champion Randy Couture in a mixed martial arts bout despite not having any mixed martial arts experience, being quickly submitted. UFC president Dana White criticized the match, calling it a freak show fight. Also, after her debut in 2015, Gabi Garcia's career for Rizin Fighting Federation (a promotion successor to Pride) has been criticized by its abundance of freak show fights.

References

Martial arts terminology
Kickboxing terminology
Mixed martial arts
Mixed martial arts mass media